Bou Thakuranir Haat is a Bengali drama film directed by Naresh Mitra based on a novel of Rabindranath Tagore in the same name, published in 1883. This film was released in 1953 in the banner of Emar Productions.

Plot
The film is based on the real-life story of Jessore Raj Pratapaditya. Pratapaditya is described as an antagonist more than a protagonist in this film.

Cast
 Uttam Kumar
 Pahari Sanyal
 Sambhu Mitra
 Bhanu Bandyopadhyay
 Manju Dey
 Naresh Mitra
 Nitish Mukherjee
 Padma Devi
 Rama Devi

References

External links
 

1953 films
Bengali-language Indian films
1953 drama films
Films based on Indian novels
Films based on works by Rabindranath Tagore
Indian drama films
1950s Bengali-language films